Orel Johnson Mangala (born 18 March 1998) is a Belgian professional footballer who plays as a midfielder for Premier League club Nottingham Forest and the Belgium national team.

Club career
On 9 June 2017, Mangala signed a four-year contract with VfB Stuttgart. On 8 August 2018, Mangala was loaned out to Hamburger SV without a purchase option until the end of the season.

On 9 April 2021, Mangala extended his contract with VfB Stuttgart until June 2024.

On 31 July 2022, it was announced that Mangala had joined Premier League side Nottingham Forest for an undisclosed fee.

International career
Mangala was called up to the senior Belgium squad in March 2021.

Personal life
Mangala is of Congolese descent.

Career statistics

Club

Honours
Belgium U17
FIFA U-17 World Cup third place: 2015

References

External links

Profile at the Nottingham Forest F.C. website

1998 births
Living people
Belgian footballers
Association football midfielders
VfB Stuttgart players
Hamburger SV players
Nottingham Forest F.C. players
Bundesliga players
2. Bundesliga players
Premier League players
Belgium youth international footballers
Belgium under-21 international footballers
Belgium international footballers
Belgian expatriate footballers
Expatriate footballers in Germany
Expatriate footballers in England
Belgian expatriate sportspeople in Germany
Belgian expatriate sportspeople in England
Black Belgian sportspeople
Belgian people of Democratic Republic of the Congo descent